Solomone Tukuafu is a New Zealand rugby union player who plays for the  in Super Rugby. His playing position is prop. He was named in the Chiefs squad for Round 5 of the 2022 Super Rugby Pacific season.

References

New Zealand rugby union players
Living people
Rugby union props
Chiefs (rugby union) players
Year of birth missing (living people)
Waikato rugby union players